The principal sports of chad are football, basketball, athletics, boxing, martial arts and fishing, which is mostly known in Lake Chad. The national stadium is the Stade Nacional in the capital, N'Djamena.

Judo in Chad
Judo is increasingly popular in Chad, and in 2017 the newly appointed president of the National Olympic Committee of Chad was the president of the Chadian Judo Federation, Abakar Djermah. At the 2012 Summer Olympics, one of Chad's only two competitors at the London Games was the judoka Carine Ngarlemdana. The Chadian Judo Federation organises an international judo tournament held in N'Djamena involving other African nations. In November 2020, N'Djamena held the African U-21 Championships.

Basketball in Chad
Basketball is a major sport in Chad, especially in the cities. In the last decade, its national team has become increasingly competitive and qualified for the 2011 African Basketball Championship.

Rugby union in Chad

 
The Chad national rugby union team represents the nation in rugby union. Rugby is a minor sport in the country but is becoming increasingly popular.

Chad at the Olympics
 

Chad (CHA) sent athletes to every Summer Olympic Games held between 1964 and 1972 and from 1984 to 2016, although the country has never won an Olympic medal. No athletes from Chad have competed in any Winter Olympic Games.

References